New York City's 23rd City Council district is one of 51 districts in the New York City Council. It has been represented by Democrat Linda Lee since 2022. She replaced former council member Barry Grodenchik, who chose not to seek re-election in 2021.

Geography
District 23 is based in the pseudo-suburbs of far eastern Queens, covering some or all of Glen Oaks, Bellerose, Fresh Meadows, Oakland Gardens, and Floral Park, and parts of Douglaston–Little Neck, Bayside, Hollis, and Queens Village. Its border with Nassau County is the easternmost point in New York City. Cunningham Park and most of Alley Pond Park are located within the district.

The district overlaps with Queens Community Boards 8, 11, 12, and 13 and with New York's 3rd, 5th, and 6th congressional districts. It also overlaps with the 11th, 14th, and 16th districts of the New York State Senate, and with the 24th, 25th, 26th, 29th, and 33rd districts of the New York State Assembly.

Recent election results

2021
In 2019, voters in New York City approved Ballot Question 1, which implemented ranked-choice voting in all local elections. Under the new system, voters have the option to rank up to five candidates for every local office. Voters whose first-choice candidates fare poorly will have their votes redistributed to other candidates in their ranking until one candidate surpasses the 50 percent threshold. If one candidate surpasses 50 percent in first-choice votes, then ranked-choice tabulations will not occur.

2017

2015 special
In 2015, Councilman Mark Weprin took a position in the administration of Governor Andrew Cuomo, leaving his seat vacant. Most special elections in New York City are officially nonpartisan, but because the election to fill Weprin's seat coincided with the 2015 municipal elections, a standard partisan primary and general election were held.

2013

References

New York City Council districts